This is a list of governors for Gotland County of Sweden, from 1689 to present.

Footnotes

References

Gotland
Gotland